Colby Nicky Robak (born April 24, 1990) is a Canadian professional ice hockey defenceman. He is currently an unrestricted free agent who most recently played with the Schwenninger Wild Wings in the Deutsche Eishockey Liga (DEL). He has formerly played in the National Hockey League (NHL) with the Florida Panthers and Anaheim Ducks.

Playing career
Robak played major junior hockey with the Brandon Wheat Kings of the Western Hockey League (WHL). He was selected by the Florida Panthers in the 2nd round (46th overall) of the 2008 NHL Entry Draft.

During the 2014–15 season, Robak was traded by the Panthers to the Anaheim Ducks in exchange for Jesse Blacker and a conditional draft pick on December 4, 2014.

Robak was not tendered a new contract by the Ducks and after going unsigned in the off-season, belatedly agreed to a one-year AHL contract with the Rochester Americans on September 28, 2015. In the 2015–16 season, Robak was a fixture on the blueline for the Americans, adding 5 goals and 20 points in 73 games.

For a second successive off-season, Robak was an un-signed free agent until he agreed to a professional try-out deal with the Stockton Heat of the AHL, affiliate to the Calgary Flames, to begin the 2016–17 season on October 14, 2016. Robak enjoyed early success with the Heat, compiling 5 assists in just 6 games and leading the AHL in Plus/minus before he left the club, to sign a guaranteed one-year deal with fellow AHL club the Utica Comets, affiliate to the Vancouver Canucks, on November 2, 2016.

On October 5, 2018, Robak signed a one-year deal with Vaasan Sport of the Finnish Liiga. This marked the first time he has played outside of North America. After a solitary season in Finland, Robak continued his European career, agreeing to a multi-year contract with German club, Schwenninger Wild Wings of the DEL on November 19, 2019.

Career statistics

Regular season and playoffs

International

Awards and honours

References

External links
 

1990 births
Living people
Anaheim Ducks players
Brandon Wheat Kings players
Canadian ice hockey defencemen
Florida Panthers draft picks
Florida Panthers players
Ice hockey people from Manitoba
Norfolk Admirals players
People from Parkland Region, Manitoba
Rochester Americans players
San Antonio Rampage players
Schwenninger Wild Wings players
Stockton Heat players
Utica Comets players
Vaasan Sport players